Hurricane Bianca: From Russia with Hate is a 2018 American comedy film directed by Matt Kugelman. It was released on May 18, 2018. A sequel to the 2016 film Hurricane Bianca, the film's plot centres on Bianca Del Rio (Roy Haylock) being driven to Russia by Debbie's (Rachel Dratch) campaign for revenge against her after being released from prison.

The film's title is a reference to the James Bond film From Russia with Love (1963).

Plot
Deborah Ward has just been released from prison, and immediately plans to get her revenge on Richard Martinez, aka Bianca Del Rio. Deborah tricks Richard into going to Russia in hopes of getting him arrested. But when Deborah's daughter Carly and Richard's slightly mentally ill friend Rex are arrested and sent to a gulag Deborah and Richard must put their differences aside and rescue their loved ones.

Cast

Reception 
Roger Moore of Movie Nation gave the film a 1.5 out of 4 stars, describing it as "a rude, crude, cameo-happy sequel to “Hurricane Bianca,” with the same crazy eye makeup and the same stars as the first daft dirty dog of a gay rights goof."

Sequel 
As of February 2019, a third film titled Hurricane Bianca 3 is in the works and will include Sykes, Dratch and several Drag Race performers in its cast. On December 20, 2022; the film title was announced as Hurricane Bianca: The Roots of All Evil. Del Rio stated in an interview that the film would be set in Africa.  Principal photography is scheduled to begin in March 2023 in Mobile, Alabama.

References

External links
 
 

2018 comedy films
2018 LGBT-related films
2018 films
American comedy films
American LGBT-related films
American sequel films
Cross-dressing in American films
Films set in Russia
LGBT-related comedy films
Drag (clothing)-related films
2010s English-language films
2010s American films